Ante Prkačin (born 14 November 1953) is a Croatian and Bosnian general, businessman and right-wing politician.

Biography
Prkačin was born in Slavonski Brod, where he also studied at the Faculty of Economics, in addition to the Faculty of Petrochemistry in Sisak.

In 1989, as a radical Croatian nationalist, he joined the christian democratic Croatian Democratic Party and won a seat in the first assembly of the Croatian Parliament in the 1990 elections, when his party was aligned with the Coalition of People's Accord.

In the late 1991, Prkačin moved to the Croatian Party of Rights. He soon became one of its representatives in Croatian Parliament, after the second Sabor election.

In 1992, when the war escalated in Bosnia and Herzegovina, Prkačin took part as a leader of HSP militia Croatian Defence Forces (Hrvatske obrambene snage, HOS) with the rank of general, and had close co-operation with government of Alija Izetbegović. In the fall of the same year, he was a member of the joint command of Croatian Defence Council and Army of Bosnia and Herzegovina.

After HOS was disbanded, Prkačin was commander of the defence of Posavina as HVO officer.

Upon his return to Croatia, he began to distance himself from Dobroslav Paraga and spent the rest of his Sabor days as independent representative.
He left HSP in 1995.

In October 1999, he founded a new party called New Croatia (Nova Hrvatska), and under its banner ran for Croatian President. In the first round of the 2000 Croatian presidential election he won just 0.28% of the vote, finishing 7th, and was eliminated.

While not achieving much in the world of politics, Prkačin managed to remain in public spotlight by often appearing in various talk shows and being involved in Croatian entertainment industry. In 2001 he tried acting and played the role of a priest in a movie Slow Surrender.

In 2004, Prkačin was briefly in the public spotlight after two of his friends engaged in an urban gunfight in Slavonski Brod because of a conflict between him and Mladen Kruljac, another officer from the Croatian war.

In January 2009, Prkačin testified as a witness before a court in Sarajevo regarding the 1999 assassination of Jozo Leutar, the then-Minister of Internal Affairs of the Federation of Bosnia and Herzegovina. Three months later, Ante Jelavić said Prkačin had implicated him and accused him of being a former member of Yugoslav secret service KOS.

In August 2009, one Sakib Balić, a former HOS soldier, publicly accused Prkačin of commanding HOS units that participated in the Sijekovac killings, when numerous Serb civilians were killed in the village of Sijekovac near Bosanski Brod on 26 March 1992. The same accusation was echoed by one Ane Mihajlović, a veteran from the Army of Republika Srpska, at the event in May 2010 when Ivo Josipović and Sulejman Tihić visited the site to pay respect to around fifty civilian victims of the March 1992 events. Prkačin denied any connection to the killings in Sijekovac. The site and the visit provoked some controversy in the Croatian public, with allegations of impropriety levelled against President Josipović and the authorities of Republika Srpska.

In 2011 Prkačin returned to Croatian Party of Rights.

References

Representatives in the modern Croatian Parliament
1953 births
Living people
Croatian Party of Rights politicians
Croatian Democratic Party politicians
Candidates for President of Croatia
Croatian nationalists
Army of the Republic of Bosnia and Herzegovina soldiers
Croatian Defence Council soldiers
People from Slavonski Brod